Anthology (B-Sides & Unreleased) is a compilation album by rapper AZ, released on November 18, 2008. The album contains songs from past albums that went under the radar and also unreleased tracks and remixes from 1995 to 2008.

Track listing
 "Burglar Rap (Intro)" – 1:19
 "Nothin' Changed" (featuring Trav) – 3:18
 "Never Change" – 4:27
 "Grammy Remix (The Essence)" (featuring Nas) – 3:44
 "City of Gods" – 4:16
 "Knowledge Is Freedom" (featuring Cassidy) – 3:09
 "I Am AZ" – 1:47
 "Serious" (featuring Nas) – 2:15
 "Sit 'Em Back Slow" (featuring M.O.P.) – 3:47
 "Sucker M.C.'s" (featuring Heavy D) – 3:38
 "Problems (Remix)" – 4:20
 "Baby Come Home" (featuring Monifa) – 4:19
 "Keep Loving U" (featuring Dave Hollister) – 3:44
 "No Strings Attached" – 4:29
 "Games" – 3:50
 "You Know" (featuring Rell) – 4:05
 "Body Rock" (featuring Twista) – 3:24
 "A Game" (featuring Consequence) – 3:37
 "Bodies Gotta Get Caught" – 3:21
 "The Good Life" (featuring Mack 10) – 3:41
 "This Is What I Do" – 3:21

References

2008 compilation albums
AZ (rapper) albums